Radical 177 or radical leather meaning "leather" or "rawhide" is one of the 11 Kangxi radicals (214 radicals in total) composed of 9 strokes.

In the Kangxi Dictionary, there are 305 characters (out of 49,030) to be found under this radical.

 is also the 179th indexing component in the Table of Indexing Chinese Character Components predominantly adopted by Simplified Chinese dictionaries published in mainland China.

Evolution

Derived characters

Literature

External links

Unihan Database - U+9769

177
179